Australian Council may refer to:

 Australian Council for Educational Research, a non-governmental educational research organisation based in Camberwell, Victoria
 Australian Council of Film Societies, the national body for film societies in Australia
 Australian Council of Social Service, an Australian advocacy group that represents the interests of organisations and individuals engaged in social welfare in Australia
 Australian Council of Trade Unions, the largest peak national body representing workers in Australia
 Australian Dance Council, a national dance advocacy organisation for dancers, choreographers, directors and educators
 Australian Medical Council, a national standards advisory body for medical education and training
 Australian National Kennel Council, the peak body in Australia responsible for promoting excellence in breeding, showing, trialling, obedience, and other canine-related activities
 Australian Press Council, the self-regulatory body of the Australian print media
 Australian Research Council, the Australian Government's main agency for allocating research funding to academics and researchers in Australian universities

See also
 Australia Council, full name the Australia Council for the Arts
 Australian Football Council (disambiguation)
 Australian Legislative Council (disambiguation)